Clare is a rural town and locality in the Shire of Burdekin, Queensland, Australia. In the  the locality of Clare had a population of 196 people.

Geography 
Clare is low-lying flat land (approx 20 metres about sea level). The Burdekin River forms the locality's eastern boundary. The land is used to grow sugarcane growing area and there is a network of cane tramways to transport the harvested sugarcane to the local sugar mills. The town is located in the east of the locality, near but not beside the river.

History
The town was originally named Mulgrave, but was changed by Surveyor-General to Clare on 20 July 1882.

A Burdekin receiving office was open by 1879. It was renamed Culburra in 1880. It became Mulgrave Post Office later that year, then Clare Post Office in 1882. It had closed by 1916.

Clare State School opened on 8 February 1950.

At the 2006 census, Clare had a population of 410.

In the  the locality of Clare had a population of 196 people.

Education 

Clare State School is a government primary (Prep-6) school for boys and girls at Larkin Street. In 2016, the school had an enrolment of 23 students with 2 teachers and 5 non-teaching staff (2 full-time equivalent). In 2018, the school had an enrolment of 19 students with 2 teachers (1 full-time equivalent) and 6 non-teaching staff (3 full-time equivalent).

There is no secondary school in Clare. The nearest secondary school is Home Hill State High School in Home Hill to the north-east.

References

External links 

Burdekin Online
Burdekin Shire Council

 Town map of Clare, 1978

Towns in Queensland
North Queensland
Shire of Burdekin
Localities in Queensland